Crow Flies High State Recreation Area is a scenic overlook located two miles west of New Town in Mountrail County, North Dakota. The site provides scenic views of Lake Sakakawea. Signs describe the location's role in local history, including its significance in the explorations of Lewis and Clark. The footprint of the drowned town of Sanish, now lost below the reservoir's waves, can be seen at times of low water.

The park is named after Hidatsa Indian chief Crow Flies High.

The park was owned by the National Park Service from 1917 to 1956.

References

External links

Crow Flies High State Recreation Area North Dakota Parks and Recreation Department

State parks of North Dakota
Protected areas of Mountrail County, North Dakota
Former national parks of the United States